Pablo Torre Carral (born 3 April 2003) is a Spanish professional footballer who plays as an attacking midfielder for FC Barcelona Atlètic.

Club career

Racing Santander
On 15 April 2020, while still a youth, he signed a professional contract with the club, until June 2025.

Torre made his senior debut with the reserves on 19 July 2020, starting in a 1–1 away draw against Gimnástica de Torrelavega, for the year's Tercera División promotion play-offs. In August, aged only 17, he was a part of the first team squad in the pre-season under manager Javi Rozada, and was definitely promoted to the main squad in September.

Torre made his first team debut for Racing on 18 October 2020, starting in the opening match of the 2020–21 Segunda División B, a 1–1 home draw against Club Portugalete. He scored his first senior goal the following 21 February, netting his team's second in a 3–1 home win over CD Laredo; six days later, he scored a brace in a 4–0 away routing of Barakaldo CF.

A regular starter during his first full season as a senior, Torre was assigned the number 10 jersey ahead of the 2021–22 campaign, in the new third tier called Primera División RFEF. He contributed with ten goals in 32 matches (play-offs included) as Racing achieved promotion to Segunda División.

Barcelona
On 4 March 2022, FC Barcelona reached an agreement with Racing for the transfer of Torre for a fee of €5 million plus variables, and he was initially assigned to the B team for the 2022–23 season. He signed a contract until June 2026 on 15 June.

On 7 September 2022, Torre played his first Champions League match, coming on for Franck Kessié in the 81st minute, in a 5–1 win over Viktoria Plzeň in the first match of the 2022–23 season. On 23 October, Torre played his first La Liga game for Barcelona at Camp Nou, coming on for Ousmane Dembélé in the 77th minute against Athletic Bilbao. On 1 November, he scored his first Champions League goal in a 4–2 away win over Viktoria Plzeň in the second leg of the same season.

Personal life
Torre's father Esteban was also a footballer and a midfielder. He represented Racing for the most of his career.

Career statistics

Club

Honours
Racing Santander
Primera División RFEF: 2021–22

References

External links

2003 births
Living people
Footballers from Cantabria
Spanish footballers
Association football midfielders
Primera Federación players
Segunda División B players
Tercera División players
Rayo Cantabria players
Racing de Santander players
FC Barcelona Atlètic players
Spain youth international footballers
Spain under-21 international footballers
People from the Bay of Santander